Vaz-e Sofla (also Romanized as Vāz-e Soflá; also known as Vāz, Vāz-e Pā’īn, Vāz Pā’īn, and Waz) is a village in Natel-e Restaq Rural District, Chamestan District, Nur County, Mazandaran Province, Iran. At the 2006 census, its population was 174, in 42 families.

References 

Populated places in Nur County